is a Japanese musical arranger and guitarist in distributors Being Inc., mainly in their label Giza Studio. In years 2000-2002 he was part of the Japanese soul band Nothin' but love, in years 2004-2009 part of Japanese pop band OOM and since 2012 he's member of fusion band Sensation as a guitarist.

List of provided works as arranger
★ album ☆ single/coupling

Miho Komatsu  
Kanashii Koi☆
Kimi no Me ni wa Utsuranai ☆
Love Gone ☆
Miho Komatsu 4 : A Thousand Feelings ★
Saigo no Toride ☆
Aishiteru ☆
Todomaru Koto no nai Ai ☆
Dance ☆
 Gift, Comunne with you, Agaki, Demo Wasurenai, Ai no Uta (Miho Komatsu 5 : Source)★
Sakura ga Mau Koro ☆
Kimi Sae Ireba (Miho Komatsu 6 : Hanano) ★
Hito wa Oomukashi, Umi ni Sundeta kara, Diplomacy, Kimi no Naseru Waza (Miho Komatsu 7 : Prime Number)★
Sugu Koi Nante Dekiru ☆
Koi ni Nare... ☆
My darling, Fukigen ni Naru Watashi (Miho Komatsu 8 : A Piece of Cake) ★

Zard
Mado no Soto wa Monochrome, hero, Sekai wa Kitto Mirai no Naka -another style 21- (Toki no Tsubasa) ★
Itoshii Hito yo -Na mo naki Tabibito yo- ☆

Aiuchi Rina
Spark (Power of Words) ★
Silver hide and seek ☆
PARTY TIME PARTY UP (Trip) ★

Azumi Uehara
Song for you-Will- (Ikitakuwanai Bokutachi) ★

Hayami Kishimoto
Jumping! Go Let's Go! ☆

Akane Sugazaki
Beginning dream ☆
Fly high ☆
Boyfriend ☆
Kimi ni Aitakute, Ribbon in the sky, Truth (beginning) ★

Shiori Takei
Circle (Diary) ★
Cherish you (Shiori Takei Best) ★

Aiko Kitahara
Sun rise train ☆
Amore -Koiseyo! Otometachi yo!- ☆
Paradise (Aiko Kitahara Best) ★

the★tambourines
Wonder boy ☆
Atsui Namida ☆
Dive to the sky ☆

Mai Kuraki
Love Sick, Kakenukeru Inazuma, Don't Leave Me Alone, You look at me~one (Fuse of Love) ★
Cuz you'll know that you're right ☆
Cherish the Day (Diamond Wave)★

Yumi Shizukusa 
Any more (Control Your Touch) ★

Ai Takaoka
Leaving ☆
I need you for my life ☆
Ice candy, Ai wa Gokigen (Acoustic Love) ★
Never to Return (Fiction) ★

U-ka Saegusa in dB
Because I love you good-bye street (U-ka saegusa IN db 1st ~Kimi to Yakusoku Shita Yasashii Ano Basho made~)★

B'z
Las Vegas, No excuse, Amarinimo, Epic Day, Black Coffee, Man Of the March (Epic Day) ★

Wag
All For Your Love ☆

List of provided works as composer

Mai Kuraki
Kakenukeru Inazuma, Don't Leave Me Alone, You look at me~one (Fuse of Love) ★

Aiko Kitahara
Te Quiero Te Amo ~Natsu no Natsu no Koi~ ☆

Yumi Shizukusa
Move On ☆

Interview
Entertainmentstation 1.3.2016

References

External links
Profile from Official Sensation website 
Official Website Nothin' but love 
Official Website OOM 

Being Inc. artists
Japanese music arrangers
Japanese guitarists
Living people
1971 births
People from Hyōgo Prefecture
21st-century guitarists